The second Schüssel government was sworn in on 28 February 2003 and was replaced on 11 January 2007.

Composition

References

Politics of Austria
Schüssel II
2000s in Austria
2003 establishments in Austria
2007 disestablishments in Austria